

Champions
World Series: Boston Red Sox over Philadelphia Phillies (4–1)

Inter-league playoff:  Boston (AL) declined challenge by Chicago (FL)

Inter-league playoff:  Philadelphia (NL) declined challenge by Chicago (FL)

Awards and honors
MLB Most Valuable Player Award
None given

Statistical leaders

Major league baseball final standings

American League final standings

National League final standings

Federal League final standings

Events

January 2 – The St. Louis Cardinals try to prevent outfielder Lee Magee from playing for the Brooklyn Tip-Tops of the Federal League. Like most such suits, it will fail. Magee will play and manage in the rival major league.
January 4 –  Infielder Hans Lobert, well known as the fastest man in the National League, is traded by the Philadelphia Phillies to the New York Giants in exchange for pitcher Al Demaree, infielder Milt Stock, and catcher Bert Adams.
January 17 – Cleveland newspapers reported that the Indians had been chosen to replace the previous nickname of the Naps local team. They became the Bronchos in 1902 before taking on the name Naps the following year in honour of their player-manager Nap Lajoie, who was purchased by the Philadelphia Athletics at beginning of the year. A false rumor claimed that the origin of the Indians name was former Cleveland Spiders outfielder Chief Sockalexis, regarded as the first man of Native American ancestry to play in Major League Baseball.
February 24, 1915 – William Stephen Devery and Thomas A. Fogarty, owners of the Jersey City Skeeters, forfeited the franchise to the International League.
April 15 – Rube Marquard of the New York Giants tosses a no-hitter against the Brooklyn Robins in a 2–0 Giants win.
May 6:
Boston Red Sox pitcher Babe Ruth hit his first major league career home run off the Yankees' Jack Warhop at New York's Polo Grounds.
Philadelphia Athletics catcher Wally Schang set an American League record after nailing six potential base stealers during a 3–0 loss to the St. Louis Browns.
May 12 – Red Faber of the Chicago White Sox uses only 67 pitches in a complete game victory, beating the Washington Senators on three hits, 4–1.
June 5 - Grover Alexander pitches a one-hit 5–0 victory over the St. Louis Cardinals at St. Louis.
June 15 – In a pitching duel at Fenway Park‚ Smoky Joe Wood of the Boston Red Sox bests Chicago White Sox ace Red Faber‚ 3–0, and knocks Chicago into second place. Each pitcher allows five hits and strikes out five. Bobby Wallace makes his umpiring debut. Wallace had been discarded by the St. Louis Browns and refused an offer from the St. Louis Cardinals‚ but he will tire of umpiring after the season ends and return to play with the Browns.
June 17 – Zip Zabel comes out of the Chicago Cubs bullpen with two outs in the first inning to face the Brooklyn Robins. Zabel wins the game in the 19th inning, 4–3, in the longest relief effort in major league history. Brooklyn starter Jeff Pfeffer goes the distance, scattering 15 hits as he labors 18⅔ innings, only to lose on a throwing error by second baseman George Cutshaw.
June 23 - In his major league debut, Bruno Haas of the Philadelphia A's pitches a complete game. Haas walks 16 batters in nine innings as the A's fall to the Yankees 15–7. 
July 5 – Cincinnati Reds third baseman Heinie Groh hits for the cycle against the Chicago Cubs, becoming the only player to do so between 1913 and 1917, and the last Reds player to do so until 1940.
August 18 – Wilbur Good became the only Chicago Cubs player ever to steal second base, third, and home — all in the same inning. His teammates followed his good example and went on to beat the Brooklyn Robins 9–0.
August 31 – In the first game of a doubleheader, Jimmy Lavender pitches a no-hitter, leading the Chicago Cubs to a 2–0 victory over the New York Giants.
September 11 – Eddie Plank of the Federal League St. Louis Terriers records his 300th career win.
September 29 - Phillies pitcher Grover Alexander pitches a complete game, giving up only one hit in a 5–0 victory over the Boston Braves in Boston to clinch their very first National League pennant.
October 13 – The Boston Red Sox defeat the Philadelphia Phillies, 5–4, in Game 5 of the World Series to win their third World Championship title, four games to one.  The Phillies would not appear in the Series again until 1950.

Births

January
January 3 – Sid Hudson
January 6 – Tom Ferrick
January 6 – Chuck Workman
January 7 – Red Steiner
January 8 – Walker Cooper
January 11 – Dutch Mele
January 12 – Roy Easterwood
January 13 – Mike Dejan
January 13 – Mike Milosevich
January 14 – Bob Joyce
January 15 – Dick Culler
January 17 – Lum Harris
January 17 – Mayo Smith
January 26 – Rip Russell
January 27 – Buck Etchison

February
February 1 – Woody Abernathy
February 3 – Buck Ross
February 9 – Harvey Green
February 10 – Ralph Hodgin
February 10 – Karl Winsch
February 13 – Oad Swigart
February 14 – Red Barrett
February 18 – Lew Flick
February 18 – Joe Gordon
February 25 – Roy Weatherly
February 26 – Stew Bowers
February 26 – Bill Conroy

March
March 1 – Nick Strincevich
March 2 – Babe Barna
March 5 – Vic Bradford
March 5 – Stan Ferens
March 5 – Harry Shuman
March 6 – Pete Gray
March 6 – Bob Swift
March 7 – Soup Campbell
March 7 – Jim Reninger
March 13 – Buzz Clarkson
March 15 – Don Lang
March 19 – Joe Gonzales
March 20 – Stan Spence
March 21 – Bill Brandt
March 22 – Norm Branch
March 25 – Chris Hartje
March 27 – Newt Kimball
March 28 – Joe Krakauskas
March 29 – Johnny Gorsica

April
April 1 – Jeff Heath
April 2 – Al Barlick
April 8 – Kirby Higbe
April 9 – Steve Shemo
April 13 – Oscar Grimes
April 15 – Joe Hoover
April 19 – Harry Craft
April 19 – Glenn McQuillen
April 20 – Eric Tipton
April 23 – Walter Brown

May
May 1 – Bob Harris
May 2 – Whitey Miller
May 2 – Ken Richardson
May 4 – Don Manno
May 4 – Ox Miller
May 6 – Les Webber
May 12 – Harry Dean
May 14 – Red Hayworth
May 19 – Jake Early
May 22 – Otey Clark
May 24 – Ed Wheeler
May 29 – Vance Dinges

June
June 1 – Bud Metheny
June 4 – Bill Holland
June 6 – Ray Stoviak
June 23 – Johnny Humphries
June 23 – Aaron Robinson
June 24 – Buster Adams
June 26 – Willard Brown
June 27 – Fred Martin
June 29 – Dizzy Trout
June 30 – Roberto Ortiz

July
July 1 – Boots Poffenberger
July 1 – Babe Young
July 2 – Hal Wagner
July 9 – Tony Criscola
July 10 – George Dickey
July 15 – John Antonelli
July 15 – John Davis
July 15 – Lefty Scott
July 20 – Gene Hasson
July 21 – Claude Corbitt
July 21 – Connie Creeden
July 22 – Butch Sutcliffe
July 23 – Hersh Lyons
July 26 – Mel Deutsch
July 27 – Dick Kimble
July 30 – Jerry Witte
July 31 – Jess Pike

August
August 4 – Luke Easter
August 7 – Les Fleming
August 9 – Arnie Moser
August 15 – Charley Suche
August 18 – Max Lanier
August 18 – Agapito Mayor
August 19 – Bill Nagel
August 23 – Gil Torres
August 24 – Chubby Dean
August 25 – Joe Gantenbein
August 26 – Heinz Becker
August 27 – Emil Verban
August 29 – Ford Garrison

September
September 3 – Eddie Stanky
September 3 – Lefty West
September 5 – Bob Maier
September 7 – Regino Otero
September 8 – Len Gabrielson
September 13 – Morrie Aderholt
September 19 – Paul Kardow
September 21 – Ed Walczak
September 22 – Reese Diggs
September 27 – Harry Chozen

October
October 1 – Red Tramback
October 3 – Charlie Letchas
October 6 – Dutch Meyer
October 10 – Harry Eisenstat
October 12 – Lou Novikoff
October 14 – William Ford
October 14 – Ken Heintzelman
October 14 – Max Macon
October 16 – Paul Masterson
October 17 – Mike Sandlock
October 18 – George Gick
October 19 – Sam Nahem
October 30 – Red Borom

November
November 8 – Wayne Ambler
November 9 – Benny McCoy
November 11 – George Case
November 11 – Bill Lefebvre
November 13 – Ted Wilks
November 16 – Garth Mann
November 16 – Blas Monaco
November 20 – Jack Aragón
November 23 – Bob Kahle
November 24 – Dick West
November 25 – Bob Finley

December
December 3 – Butch Wensloff
December 5 – Bobby Mattick
December 7 – Johnny Gee
December 7 – Vinnie Smith
December 14 – Paul Erickson
December 18 – Johnny Barrett
December 19 – Mickey Witek
December 19 – Eddie Yount
December 20 – Marv Felderman
December 24 – Frank Trechock
December 26 – Frank Dascoli
December 28 – Hank Sweeney

Deaths

January–March
January 27 – John Coleman, 54, pitcher for the 1890 Philadelphia Phillies.
January 29 – George Baker, 57, outfielder who played from 1883 through 1886 for the Baltimore Orioles, St. Louis Maroons, and Kansas City Cowboys.
February 5 – Ross Barnes, 64, star second baseman of the 1870s who batted .359 lifetime, winning first National League batting title with .429 mark, also leading league in runs, hits, doubles, triples and walks.
February 9 – Red Waller, 31, who pitched in one game for the 1909 New York Giants of the National League.
February 17 – Jersey Bakley, 50, 19th century pitcher for nine teams in four different leagues, who posted a 3.66 ERA and struck out 669 in 215 games, even though he had a 76–125 record.
February 24 – George Moolic, 47, backup catcher for the Chicago White Stockings 1886 National League champions.
February 24 – Adonis Terry, 50, 1890s pitcher for the Brooklyn, Pittsburgh and Chicago teams, who won 197 games, including two no-hitters.
March 15 – Jim Donnelly, 49, 19th century third baseman who hit .230 in eleven seasons for nine teams in two different leagues.

April–June
April 9 – Rabbit Robinson, 33, infielder/outfielder for the Washington Senators (1903), Detroit Tigers (1904), and Cincinnati Reds (1910).
April 15 – Frank Figgemeier, 41, pitcher who played for the 1894 Philadelphia Phillies of the National League.
April 21 – Jack Allen, 59, National League third baseman who played for the Syracuse Stars and the Cleveland Blues during the 1879 season.
May 4 – Chuck Lauer, 50, National League outfielder for the Pittsburgh Alleghenys (1884, 1889) and the Chicago Colts (1890).
June 2 – Dave Orr, 55, first baseman and a perennial .300 hitter for five teams in three different leagues during eight seasons, who led American Association in average and runs batted in 1884, led twice in hits and triples, and posted a career .342 average while collecting 100 or more RBI in four seasons.
June 4 – Tim Hurst, 49, umpire for nine National League seasons between 1891 and 1903 and in the American League from 1905 to 1909; officiated in Temple Cup series of 1894–95, managed the 1898 Browns, and also was a colorful figure known for his combative relations with players.
June 6 – Tom Berry, 72, who appeared in one game for the 1871 Philadelphia Athletics.
June 12 – Pat Crisham, 38, first baseman and catcher who hit .291 in 53 games for the Baltimore Orioles of the National League in 1899.
June 18 – Charlie Faust, 34, who pitched in just two games for the 1911 New York Giants and stole two bases, but made his mark as John McGraw's good-luck charm and team's mascot.

July–September
July 1 – Phil Coridan, 56, second baseman/outfielder for the Chicago Browns of the Union Association in 1884.
July 7 – Mike DePangher, 56, catcher for the 1884 Philadelphia Quakers of the National League.
July 18 – Larry McKeon, 49, pitcher who posted a 14–19 record and a 3.71 in 116 games for three teams in two different leagues from 1884 to 1886.
July 26 – Charlie Reising, 53, outfielder for the 1884 Indianapolis Hoosiers of the American Association.
August 21 – Blaine Thomas, 27, who pitched briefly for the 1911 Boston Red Sox.
August 30 – William Coon, 60, catcher/right fielder for the 1975–1876 Philadelphia Athletics.
September 9 – Albert Goodwill Spalding, 65, pitcher who led league in wins every season from 1871 to 1876, retiring at age 27 with 253 victories; also batted .313 lifetime, managed Chicago to 1876 pennant in NL's first season and guided team to three pennants as team president from 1882 to 1891; staged sport's first world tour in 1888.
September 11 – John Carbine, 59, first baseman for the 1875 Keokuk Westerns and the 1876 Louisville Grays.
September 16 – Wally Goldsmith, 65, utility infielder and catcher who played from 1868 to 1875 in the National Association with the Baltimore Marylands, Fort Wayne Kekiongas, Washington Olympics and Keokuk Westerns.
September 23 – Brickyard Kennedy, 47, pitcher who won 20 games four times for Brooklyn, pitching also in the 1903 World Series for the Pirates.
September 26 – Ed Cushman, 63, pitcher for six seasons, who threw a no-hitter on September 28, 1884.

October–December
October 2 – Tommy Beals, 65, outfielder/second baseman for six seasons, five of them in the National Association.
October 12 – Bert Myers, 41, third baseman who played from 1896 to 1900 for the St. Louis Browns, Washington Senators and Philadelphia Phillies.
October 14 – Bill Reidy, 42, 19th century pitcher who posted a 27–41 record and a 4.17 ERA for three teams in two different leagues.
October 19 – Russ McKelvy, 61, National League right fielder for the 1882 Indianapolis Blues, who also played with the Pittsburgh Alleghenys in 1882.
October 27 – Martin Mullen, 63, right fielder in one game for the 1872 Cleveland Forest Citys of the National Association.
November 2 – Fred Bunce, 68, National Association umpire.
November 9 – Otis Johnson, 32, shortstop for the New York Highlanders of the American League in 1911.
November 14 – Art McGovern, 33, Canadian catcher who played for the 1905 Boston Americans of the American League.
December 4 – Oscar Purner, 41, pitcher for the Washington Senators of the National League during the 1895 season.
December 14 – Danny Murphy, 51, backup catcher for the 1892 New York Giants of the National League.
December 15 – Tony Murphy, 56, American Association catcher who played for the 1884 New York Metropolitans.
December 16 – John Hofford, 52, National League pitcher for the Pittsburgh Alleghenys of the American Association in 1885 and 1886.
December 26 – Art Ball, 39, National League infielder for the 1894 St. Louis Browns and the 1898 Baltimore Orioles.
December 26 – John Doyle, 57, Canadian pitcher who played in 1882 for the St. Louis Brown Stockings of the American Association.
December 31 – Tip O'Neill, 57, Canadian left fielder for four teams in three different leagues, who won American Association batting titles in 1887 and 1888 while collecting a .326 average in 1052 games.

References